The Vince Leah Trophy is an annual award given to the player selected as the most proficient in his first year of competition in the Manitoba Junior Hockey League during the regular season. The Rookie of the Year award was created in 1950.  From 1967 to 1977, the award winner was presented the Gordon Petrie Memorial Trophy.

Vince Leah was a sportswriter for The Winnipeg Tribune and the Winnipeg Free Press, founded the Excelsior Hockey Club in 1934, which produced forty future professional hockey players and won thirteen provincial championships.

Recipients

References

External links
Manitoba Junior Hockey League

Manitoba Junior Hockey League trophies and awards